This is a list of the Croatia national under-21 football team results from 2020 to the present.

Croatia entered its fourth 2021 Euro, where it was eliminated in the quarter-finals, its greatest accomplishment in the tournament so far. The team also qualified the 2023 Euro that is scheduled to be played in Romania and Georgia in June and July 2023.

Key 

Match outcomes

As per statistical convention in football, matches decided in extra time are counted as wins and losses, while matches decided by penalty shoot-outs are counted as draws.

By year

2020

2021

2022

2023

2024

Record per opponent

Notes

References 

2020s in Croatia
Croatia national under-21 football team